SPILL Festival of Performance is an artist-led biennale of experimental theatre and live art in the UK which began in 2007 and takes place in a variety of venues in London and Ipswich, England. The festival is produced by Pacitti Company and the Artistic Director is Robert Pacitti.

Launched in 2007, the SPILL Festival presents new and experimental theatre and performance work from new and established work from UK and international artists.

In addition to the biennale Festival SPILL National Platform and Showcase takes place every two years in Ipswich and presents artists in the early stages of their career working in the fields of live art, performance and experimental theatre, selected through an open submission process. 

The festival has been held in various venues and spaces in London and Ipswich, including, The Barbican, Southbank Centre, The National Theatre Studio, Soho Theatre, Shunt Vaults, Shoreditch Town Hall, Greenwich Dance, Laban, Soho Square, and Toynbee Studios.

Artists

Spill Festival 2007 

Productions have included:
 Covet Me, Care for Me, Sheila Ghelani
 Trans: Acts, Julia Bardsley
 Collected Works, Eve Dent
 Ringside, Mem Morrison
 Sacred, The Rite of Spring, Raimund Hoghe
 Three Duets, Pacitti Company

At SPILL Festival 2009 there were approximately 100 live performances by artists from Australia, Belgium, Germany, Italy, the U.S. and from across the UK.

Spill Festival 2009
Paradiso by Romeo Castellucci, Italy
Inferno by Romeo Castellucci, Italy
Dinner With America, Rajni Shah, UK
That Night follows Day, Victoria & Tim Etchells (Forced Entertainment), Belgium/UK
A Forest, Pacitti Company, UK
Purgatorio, By Romeo Castellucci, Italy
Saving the World, Gob Squad, Germany/UK
Visions of Excess, Ron Athey & Lee Adams, USA/UK
A True Story About Two People, Julie Tolentino, USA
Listen, My Secret Fetish, Richard Haynes, Australia
Aftermaths: A Tear in the Meat of Vision, Julia Bardsley, UK
The Modes of Al-Ikseer, Harminder Singh Judge, UK
Tears of Eros, Carla Esperanza Tommasini, Italy/UK
The Porcelain Project, Grace Ellen Barkey and Needcompany, Belgium
'Look mummy, I’m dancing, Vanessa, BelgiumKim Noble Will Die, Kim Noble, UKOrgy of Tolerance, Jan Fabre, BelgiumPrototypes, Robin Deacon, UKVoid Story, Forced Entertainment, UKIntermission, Pacitti Company, UKI Feel Love!, George Chakravarthi, UK

 Spill Festival 2011 

 Glorious, Rajni Shah
 Do What Thou Wilt, Harminder Judge
 I Guess If The Stage Exploded, Sylvia Rimat
 In Eldersfield Chapter 1, Kings of England
 Body House Version 1, Shabnam Shabazi (UK)
 Unto Us A Child is Born, Rachel Mars
 Foley'', Jo Bannon

SPILL Salons
Spill Salons are a public space which bring groups of people together along with a ‘Thinker-in-Residence’ to look at some of the over-riding themes within the Festival. The public salons are where experts from a range of different territories discuss relevant issues affecting performance.

References

External links
SPILL Festival 2007
SPILL Festival 2009
SPILL Overspill
Guardian - Article by Lyn Gardner on SPILL 2009

Arts festivals in England
Arts in London